George Dornbusch (1819 – 1873) was an Austrian businessperson and activist for vegetarianism and various other causes including abolitionism, anti-vaccination, temperance, women's suffrage and the peace movement. He was an early proponent of veganism.

Biography 
Dornbush was born in Trieste, in 1819. Dornbusch became a vegan in 1843, "partaking neither of fish, flesh, fowl, butter, milk, cheese, or eggs, and abstaining also from the use of tea, coffee, intoxicating drinks, salt, and tobacco", Francis William Newman also described him as abstaining from, "every form of vegetable grease or oil, from the chief vegetable spices, such as pepper and ginger, and emphatically from salt." 

Dornbusch moved to England in 1845, where he settled in London with his family. He later became one of the first members of the Vegetarian Society. Dornbusch remarried after his wife's death and in 1866, along with his daughter and second wife, signed a petition for women's suffrage. He was also a member of the general committee of the Emancipation Society, along with John Stuart Mill, as well as a member of the National Society for Women's Suffrage, which he served on the central committee for from 1871 to 1872.

Dornbusch died from bronchitis in 1873; he was buried in Abney Park Cemetery, London.

References

Further reading 
 

1819 births
1873 deaths
Abolitionists
Anti-vivisectionists
Austrian anti-vaccination activists
Austrian anti-war activists
Austrian businesspeople
Austrian suffragists
Austrian Theosophists
Burials at Abney Park Cemetery
Deaths from bronchitis
People associated with the Vegetarian Society
People from Trieste
Temperance activists
Vegetarianism activists